Mount San Jacinto State Park is in the San Jacinto Mountains, of the Peninsular Ranges system, in Riverside County, California, United States.  A majority of the park is within the Santa Rosa and San Jacinto Mountains National Monument.  The park is near the Greater Los Angeles and San Diego metropolitan areas.

Geography
It is accessible by the Palm Springs Aerial Tramway and lies on the Pacific Crest Trail.

Newton B. Drury Peak within Mount San Jacinto State Park is named after the fourth director of the U.S. National Park Service, who was also a long-term leader of the Save the Redwoods League.

2011 State budget crisis closure
The state park was one of 48 state parks proposed for closure in January 2008 by then Governor Arnold Schwarzenegger as part of a state deficit reduction program. During the 2008–10 California budget crisis the legislature considered the state park systems funding, operations, and closures. By 2011 the legislature and Governor Jerry Brown enacted Assembly Bill 95 in March, which closed the park temporarily over certain days.

See also
 Santa Rosa and San Jacinto Mountains National Monument
 Cranston Fire

References

External links

 California State Parks: Official Mount San Jacinto State Park website

State parks of California
Parks in Riverside County, California
Parks on the National Register of Historic Places in California
San Jacinto Mountains
National Register of Historic Places in Riverside County, California